Majarrah is a triannual arabophone Moroccan literary magazine published by the Mohammed El Boukili Foundation in Qunaitara, Morocco. The first issue was published on 1 April 1996.

Moroccan literary figures such as the novelist Mohamed Choukri and the critic Muhammad Barada have contributed to the magazine.

References

1996 establishments in Morocco
Arabic-language magazines
Literary magazines
Magazines established in 1996
Magazines published in Morocco
Triannual magazines